The Großer Bärenberg is high hill in Hesse, Germany.

Hills of Hesse